Michael Edward John Gore, CVO, CBE (20 September 1935 – 8 July 2022) was a British diplomat who was Governor of the Cayman Islands from 1992 to 1995.

References

External links 

 List of Governors and Predecessors of the Cayman Islands
 Cayman Islands Government Web Site

1935 births
2022 deaths
Commanders of the Royal Victorian Order
Commanders of the Order of the British Empire
Members of HM Diplomatic Service
Governors of the Cayman Islands
High Commissioners of the United Kingdom to the Bahamas
Ambassadors of the United Kingdom to Liberia
Fellows of the Royal Photographic Society
British journalists
British Army General List officers
20th-century British diplomats